The 1941 Winnipeg Blue Bombers finished in 1st place in the WIFU with a 6–2 record. The Blue Bombers won their third Grey Cup championship by defeating the Ottawa Rough Riders 18–16.

Exhibition games

Regular season

Standings

Schedule

A. Winnipeg forfeited this game for using an ineligible player, Ken Preston.

Playoffs

Grey Cup

References

Winnipeg Blue Bombers seasons
Grey Cup championship seasons